Robert ("Rob") Muzzio (born 25 June 1964, in Würzburg, West Germany to American parents) is a retired male decathlete from the United States, who represented Team USA at the 1992 Summer Olympics. He retired in 1996 after fifteen years of competition. His personal best was 8237 points, achieved at the World Championships in 1993. Muzzio attended George Mason University in Fairfax, VA and was the first decathlete in NCAA Division I history to win back-to-back NCAA decathlon titles in 1984 & 85.

Currently, he is the pole vaulting coach for the Track and Field team at Robinson Secondary School in Fairfax, where he attended high school. Rob has a wife, Natalie, and two children, Joey and Maria.

Achievements

References
IAAF Profile

1964 births
Living people
American male decathletes
Athletes (track and field) at the 1992 Summer Olympics
Olympic track and field athletes of the United States
George Mason Patriots men's track and field athletes